Marcin Marek Głowacki (born 18 February 1973 in Łódź) is a Polish former ice dancer. He and partner Agnieszka Domańska trained in Łódź, coached by Maria Olszewska-Lelonkiewicz.

Domańska / Głowacki placed 12th at the World Junior Figure Skating Championships in 1991, 20th and 21st at the World Figure Skating Championships in 1992 and 1993, respectively, and 19th, 14th, 15th at the European Figure Skating Championships in 1992, 1993 and 1994, respectively. They also skated at the 1994 Olympic Games, where they placed 17th.

After retiring from competition, Głowacki moved to the U.K. He has a daughter, Jade, born in 1997, with his wife, Michelle.

Results
(ice dance with Agnieszka Domańska)

References

 Skatebase: Historical Skating Results

Polish male ice dancers
Figure skaters at the 1994 Winter Olympics
Olympic figure skaters of Poland
Living people
Sportspeople from Łódź
1973 births